Bear Creek is an  tributary of the Upper Iowa River, joining Waterloo Creek for a short distance before entering the Upper Iowa in Waterloo Township just east of where Iowa Highway 76 crosses the river. Its branches are acclaimed trout fishing streams.

The main or South fork rises in Hesper and Highland Townships in Winneshiek County, and gives its name to South Bear Complex, maintained by the state of Iowa and flows in a rough west to east direction.

The North Bear Creek rises in Houston County, Minnesota, south of Spring Grove, entering Iowa into Highland Township in Winneshiek County, and joins the main branch just west of the Allamakee County line in a generally north-to-southeast direction; the state-maintained North Bear Complex is named for it.

The stream continues into Allamakee County, joining Waterloo Creek a short distance from where the two creeks merge with the Upper Iowa. The Upper Iowa itself continues towards its heads in a southwesterly direction.

See also
List of rivers of Iowa

References

Iowa Department of Natural Resources (retrieved 3 April 2007)
Map from Iowa DNR (*.pdf) (retrieved 3 April 2007)
US Fish and Wildlife Service (retrieved 3 April 2007)
Trout Unlimited press release (retrieved 3 April 2007)

Tributaries of the Upper Iowa River
Rivers of Allamakee County, Iowa
Rivers of Houston County, Minnesota
Rivers of Iowa
Rivers of Minnesota
Rivers of Winneshiek County, Iowa